Cynthiacetus is an extinct genus of basilosaurid early whale that lived during the Late Eocene (Bartonian-Priabonian, .)  Specimens have been found in the southeastern United States and Peru (Otuma Formation).

Description 

Cynthiacetus was named after the town of Cynthia, Mississippi, close to where the type specimen for the species C. maxwelli was discovered.

The skull of C. maxwelli was similar in size and morphology to that of Basilosaurus cetoides, but Cynthiacetus lacked the elongated vertebrae of Basilosaurus.  erected the genus to avoid the nomen dubium Pontogeneus (which was based on poorly described and now vanished specimens).  Cynthiacetus was smaller than Masracetus.

The South American species C. peruvianus, the first archaeocete to be described on that continent, mainly differs from C. maxwelli in the number of cuspids in the lower premolars, but it also has the greatest numbers of thoracic vertebrae (20).

References

Bibliography 

 
 
 
 

Basilosauridae
Prehistoric cetacean genera
Eocene mammals of North America
Paleogene United States
Fossils of Georgia (U.S. state)
Paleontology in Mississippi
Fossils of North Carolina
Eocene mammals of South America
Tinguirirican
Paleogene Peru
Fossils of Peru
Fossil taxa described in 2005